BRP Tomas Batilo (PG-110) was the lead ship of Tomas Batilo class patrol craft of the Philippine Navy. It was part of the first batch transferred by the South Korean government on 15 June 1995, and arrived in the Philippines in August 1995. It was commissioned with the Philippine Navy on 22 May 1996.

She sank during a typhoon in 2003, and was salvaged in 2009 in a joint operation between Mobile Diving and Salvage Unit One Company 1-4 out of Naval Station Pearl Harbor and Philippine Navy divers. The salvage took just over 18 hours of bottom-time diving, and a total of six days to complete the project.

Technical Details
The craft is armed with a 1-twin 30mm Emerson Electric gun mount, a Bofors 40mm/60, and either 2 Oerlikon 20mm(twin mount) or 2 20mm General Electric Sea Vulcan Gatling Guns.

References

Patrol vessels of the Philippine Navy